Frank William Stubbs (27 September 1919 – 16 May 1997) was an Australian rules footballer who played for North Melbourne in the Victorian Football League (VFL).

Used in the ruck, Stubbs had two stints at North Melbourne, separated by World War II. He was North Melbourne's best placed player at the 1940 Brownlow Medal, with nine votes. Stubbs returned in 1945 and participated in their first ever finals match.

Stubbs finished his career at Camberwell, where he won each of their 'Best and Fairest' awards from 1948 to 1950. He also won the J. J. Liston Trophy in 1950, the club's first ever winner.

In 2003 he was named as the first ruckman in the club's Team of the Century.

References

Holmesby, Russell and Main, Jim (2007). The Encyclopedia of AFL Footballers. 7th ed. Melbourne: Bas Publishing.

External links

1919 births
1997 deaths
Australian rules footballers from Victoria (Australia)
North Melbourne Football Club players
Camberwell Football Club players
J. J. Liston Trophy winners